Bled eConference is an annual international conference on “e” (e-commerce, e-business, e-health, e-government, EDI, IOS, social networks, m-commerce etc.) attracting speakers and delegates from business and academia, government officials and IT providers from around the world. The conference is organized by eCenter of University of Maribor Faculty of Organizational Sciences, Slovenia in cooperation with an international program committee, currently counting ~55 members from ~22 countries worldwide. The program consists of Research Track, including peer reviewed research paper presentations, and Business Track, presenting panels, workshops and meetings. Since 2007 the program also includes René W. Wagenaar Prototype Bazaar dedicated to PhD and MsC students’ presentations of e-prototypes and business e-solutions.

It takes place in Bled, Slovenia.

Bled eConference is considered to be the world’s longest-running conference on “e”, established in 1988 by Jože Gričar, PhD.

Research Track 
Bled eConference has featured research papers since its inception. A fully reviewed Research Track was established in 1995, running parallel tracks of 40-50 papers each year, with an acceptance rate around 50%.
Since 1999, the Research Track has included an Outstanding Paper Award.

In 2006 Bled eConference has entered a strategic partnership with the journal, Electronic Markets.

The Research Volume of Bled eConference Proceedings is included in international AIS – Association of Information Systems Electronic Library (since 2001) and since 2008 in Conference Proceedings Citation Index - an integrated index within Web of Science.

Web 2.0 and social media will play a ver important part of the 2011 Bled eConference

History 
Established in March 1988, conference started out as a consultation meeting on Electronic Data Interchange (EDI) for the representatives of Slovenian organizations. The meeting was initiated by Jože Gričar and organized by the Chamber of Commerce and Industry of Slovenia in Ljubljana. The Second consultation meeting on EDI was held in Bled, which later becomes a traditional venue of the event, and it was open to the broader public. 120 representatives from companies, banks and government attended the meeting to hear 19 submissions and see a live demonstration of a prototype solution for the electronic order exchange. The conference had opened for international participants in its third year, adding participants from USA, Austria, Japan and Poland to the program. In 1991 the consultation meeting grows into The International Electronic Data Interchange Conference with 260 participants from 15 countries and 56 research papers.

Conference edited its name again in 1993, adding Interorganizational Systems (IOS) to it. As the development trends indicated in 1997 the terms EDI and IOS in the conference's name were substituted with the term Electronic Commerce, also the conference recognized Bled as its traditional venue (10th Bled Electronic Commerce Conference). The last change to the conference's name was made in 2005, when the conference was renamed Bled eConference due to the broader research field presented at the conference each year.

List of Bled eConferences

See also 
E-commerce
E-business
EDI - Electronic Data Interchange
Information Systems
Management Information Systems
24th  Bled E Conference Future Internet Man Sze Li 1 del
24th Bled E Conference Use of Social Media on the Cocreation Services The Case of UK Julia Glidden 1del

References

External links 
 Bled eConference Proceedings

Computer conferences
Econference
Recurring events established in 1988
Annual events in Slovenia
University of Maribor
Telecommunications in Slovenia
Summer events in Slovenia